The statue of Thomas Munro is an equestrian statue of Thomas Munro, 1st Baronet, Major-General in the British Army and Governor of Madras from 1820 to 1827, located in the city of Chennai, India. The bronze statue sculpted by Francis Chantrey in the United Kingdom in 1834 and shipped to Madras in 1839, is one of the popular landmarks in Chennai. The absence of stirrups is one of the peculiarities of the statue and for this reason, it is also referred to as "The Stirrupless Majesty".

Thomas Munro 

Thomas Munro was one of the most popular British administrators in South India. Born in Glasgow in 1761, Munro arrived in India as a soldier in 1789 and fought with distinction in the Anglo-Mysore Wars. At the end of the war, he served as a settlement officer in Canara and later, Bellary. He also fought in the Pindari War (1817). In 1820, Munro was appointed Governor of Madras and served till his death from cholera in 1827. Munro is credited with having introduced the Ryotwari System in South India and drafting an education policy for the Madras Presidency. He also supported a larger share for natives in the administration of India. Munro is the subject of a number of folk tales and ballads and is even worshipped by some.

Death of Thomas Munro 
Munro's term as Governor of Madras came to an end in 1826. As there was a delay in appointing a new Governor, Munro decided to visit the Ceded Districts of the Madras Presidency, where he had served as a settlement officer in the early 19th century, in the meantime. As he was riding through the hills of Cuddapah District along with a mixed retinue of Europeans and Indians, Munro observed a golden, thread-like glow across two hills. He remarked

His followers were perplexed as the garland was not visible to anyone. At length, an old Indian in the retinue reportedly replied, with sorrow:

After spending a few days at Ananthapur, Thomas Munro and his party reached Gooty on 4 July 1827. At Gooty, some of his men were afflicted with cholera. Two days later, at Pattikonda, Munro caught cholera from his men and had to be nursed. His condition deteriorated in the evening and he died at half-past-nine on 6 July 1827.

Munro was buried at a graveyard in Gooty. In April 1831, his remains were transported to Madras and interred in the St. Mary's Church, Fort St. George.

Construction 

When the news of Munro's death reached Madras, it was mourned by all classes of people in the city. The government issued a Gazette Extraordinary on 9 July 1827 with the message:

A public meeting was soon held in his memory in Madras city in which was made a proposal to erect a statue to Munro through public subscription. The Madras government opened a memorial for Munro in the town of Pattikonda where he had died. A choultry called "Munro Choultry" was erected in Gooty in his honour.

A total of nine thousand pounds (£8000, according to some sources) were collected through public subscription and the British sculptor Francis Chantrey was commissioned to make the statue. Chantrey completed the statue in 1834 - one of the three equestrian statues sculpted by him. According to a popular belief, the Duke of Wellington, on seeing the completed statue, had exclaimed

The statue, weighing six tonnes, was shipped to India in three parts and erected at The Island, Chennai in 1839 atop a granite plinth made by Ostheider & Co of Calcutta. The statue was ceremonially opened on 23 October 1839.

Architecture 

The statue depicts Thomas Munro riding a horse. In doing so, Chantrey had opted to follow, for commemorative purposes, the prevalent Western practice of portraying authority. It is believed that Chantrey might have modelled the statue upon his own earlier work of George IV at Trafalgar Square, London. This might have been intended to elevate Munro above the Indians whose cause he championed. Chantrey was, initially, caught in a dilemma over the choice of steed. While some of his friends and visitors suggested a classic horse, some suggested an Arabian, others a war horse. Eventually, Chantrey chose an Arab, similar to the one he had sculpted for his statue of George IV. One particular biography of Francis Chantrey considered the sculpture of Thomas Munro to be the finest among Chantrey's works and the horse, his worst ever.

The combined height of the horse and the rider is more than 15 feet. The horse gazes calmly while Munro strikes a thoughtful pose, both still, yet ready to lunge forward into motion.

Peculiarity 
The peculiarity of the statue is the absence of a saddle as well as the stirrups. While some feel that the omission is due to an oversight on the part of the sculptor, others feel that the saddle and the stirrups might have been deliberately excluded keeping in mind Munro's penchant for bareback riding. Due to the absence of stirrups, the statue is also occasionally referred to as "The Stirrupless Majesty".

Historical references

Captain Hervey has been credited with popularizing an anecdote connected with Munro's statue

Proposed removal 
During the World Classical Tamil Conference held in Coimbatore in 2010, there were demands to remove the statue of Thomas Munro, evoking strong protests from conservationists. Though the government had arrived at a decision to remove the statue, it has not yet been implemented.

References

Sources 
 

Munro
Public art in India
Monuments and memorials in Chennai
Munro
Munro
Munro
1839 sculptures
1839 establishments in British India